Esther Stam (born 11 March 1987) is a Georgian judoka.

She competed at the 2016 Summer Olympics in Rio de Janeiro, in the women's 70 kg.

References

External links
 

1987 births
Living people
Female judoka from Georgia (country)
Olympic judoka of Georgia (country)
Judoka at the 2016 Summer Olympics
Universiade medalists in judo
Universiade medalists for Georgia (country)
European Games competitors for Georgia (country)
Judoka at the 2015 European Games
Medalists at the 2011 Summer Universiade